Sim Ann (born 12 March 1975) is a Singaporean politician and former civil servant who has been serving as Senior Minister of State for National Development since 2020 and Senior Minister of State for Foreign Affairs since 2021. A member of the governing People's Action Party (PAP), she has been the Member of Parliament (MP) representing the Bukit Timah division of Holland–Bukit Timah GRC since 2011. She has also been serving as the party's Deputy Party Whip since 2019.

A recipient of the President's Scholarship, Sim started her career in the Civil Service and had worked in the Ministry of Health (MOH), Ministry of Trade and Industry (MTI) and Prime Minister's Office (PMO). 

She made her political debut in the 2011 general election as part of a four-member PAP team contesting in Holland–Bukit Timah GRC, and won 60.1% of the vote.

Education
Sim was educated at Raffles Girls' School and Hwa Chong Junior College before graduating from Exeter College at the University of Oxford in 1997 with a Bachelor of Arts (later promoted to Master of Arts by seniority) degree in philosophy, politics and economics (PPE). 

She subsequently went on to complete a Master of Arts degree in political science at Stanford University in 1998. She also completed a postgraduate diploma in translation and interpretation at the Nanyang Technological University in 2005.

Career

Civil Service career
Sim started her career in the Civil Service. 

From 1998 to 2000, she was Assistant Director for Finance Policy and Planning at the Ministry of Health (MOH). From 2000 to 2003, she was Assistant Director for Implementation Planning at the Ministry of Home Affairs (MHA). From 2003 to 2006, she was Deputy Director for Trade at the Ministry of Trade and Industry (MTI). 

From 2007 to 2009, Sim was seconded to the International Enterprise Singapore as its Regional Director based in Shanghai, where she headed a team assisting Singapore-based companies with investment and sales in East China. 

From 2009 to 2011, she was Director of the National Population Secretariat and led efforts to restructure the secretariat into the National Population and Talent Division under the Prime Minister's Office (PMO).

Political career 
Sim entered politics when she joined a four-member People's Action Party team to contest in Holland–Bukit Timah GRC during the 2011 general election. The PAP team won with 60.08% of the vote against the Singapore Democratic Party so Sim became a Member of Parliament representing the Bukit Timah ward of Holland–Bukit Timah GRC. On 21 May 2011, she was appointed Senior Parliamentary Secretary at the Ministry of Law and Ministry of Education. On 1 November 2012, she relinquished her appointment at the Ministry of Law and became Senior Parliamentary Secretary at the Ministry of Communications and Information while continuing to hold her appointment at the Ministry of Education. On 1 September 2013, she was promoted to Minister of State and continued serving at the Ministries of Education, and Communications and Information.

During the 2015 general election, Sim contested as part of a four-member PAP team in Holland–Bukit Timah GRC again and they won with 66.6% of the vote against the Singapore Democratic Party. Following the election, on 1 October 2015, Sim was promoted to Senior Minister of State and appointed to the Ministry of Finance and Ministry of Culture, Community and Youth. She was also appointed Deputy Government Whip. On 22 August 2016, she relinquished her appointment at the Ministry of Finance and switched to the Ministry of Trade and Industry while continuing to serve at the Ministry of Culture, Community and Youth. On 1 May 2018, she switched from the Ministry of Trade and Industry to the Ministry of Communications and Information, while continuing to serve at the Ministry of Culture, Community and Youth.

At the 2020 general election, Sim joined the four-member PAP team contesting in Holland–Bukit Timah GRC again and they won with 66.36% of the vote against the Singapore Democratic Party. On 27 July 2020, Sim was appointed Senior Minister of State at the Ministry of National Development and Ministry of Communications and Information. On 15 May 2021, she relinquished her appointment at the Ministry of Communications and Information and became Senior Minister of State at the Ministry of Foreign Affairs while concurrently serving as Senior Minister of State at the Ministry of National Development.

Personal life 
Sim is married to Mok Ying Jang, a doctor who is the Deputy Chief Operating Officer of the National Healthcare Group Polyclinics. Mok was also a member of the first Singaporean team to climb Mount Everest in 1998. Sim and Mok have two sons and one daughter.

References

External links 

 
 Sim Ann on Parliament of Singapore
 Sim Ann, PAP media release, 14 April 2011

Members of the Parliament of Singapore
People's Action Party politicians
Singaporean women in politics
President's Scholars
Singaporean people of Hokkien descent
Alumni of Exeter College, Oxford
Stanford University alumni
1975 births
Living people
Raffles Girls' Secondary School alumni
Hwa Chong Junior College alumni